is a railway station on the Ban'etsu West Line in the town of Nishiaizu, Yama District, Fukushima Prefecture,  Japan, operated by East Japan Railway Company (JR East).

Lines

Station layout
Nozawa Station has one side platform  and one island platform, connected to the station building by a footbridge. The station is staffed.

Platforms

History
Nozawa Station opened on August 1, 1913. The station was absorbed into the JR East network upon the privatization of the Japanese National Railways (JNR) on April 1, 1987.

Passenger statistics
In fiscal 2017, the station was used by an average of 156 passengers daily (boarding passengers only).

Surrounding area
Nishiaizu Town Hall

See also
 List of railway stations in Japan

References

External links

 JR East Station information 

Railway stations in Fukushima Prefecture
Ban'etsu West Line
Railway stations in Japan opened in 1913
Nishiaizu, Fukushima